Cecilia Helena Ferm (born 9 October 1975) is a Swedish deaf female basketball player. She has represented both national and deaf basketball teams. Ferm has participated at the Deaflympics on 5 occasions since making her debut in the 1993 Summer Deaflympics. 

She was the key member of the Swedish deaf basketball team that won silver medals at the 1997, 2001 and 2005 Deaflympic events. In her last Deaflympic event, she was able to claim the gold medal for Sweden in the basketball for the first time in Deaflympic history after a stunning victory over favourites USA and it ended the gold medal jinx for Sweden.

She won the ICSD Deaf Sportswoman of the Year award in 2000 and in 2004 for her outstanding performance in the deaf basketball competitions including the deaflympic basketball. Cecilia Ferm was also nominated for the Deaf Sportswoman of the Year award by the ICSD in 1998, 1999, 2002 and in 2007. 

She too has played for some elite basketball club teams such as Solna Vikings, Akropol and Nerike Basket. Cecilia Ferm is currently playing for the Swedish club side, AIK Basket.

References 

1975 births
Living people
Deaf basketball players
Swedish women's basketball players
Solna Vikings players
Sportspeople from Stockholm
Swedish deaf people
Forwards (basketball)